Bracera "Our Lady of the sea" is a replica of a traditional Croatian sailboat from the 18th century launched in April 2011 and operated by The Dolphin Dream Society. She was built by Mile Jadrešić, a traditional boat builder from Betina on the island of Murter, according to designs of Velimir Salamon and Nenad Bobanac. Before departing for Dubrovnik, her home port, "Our Lady of the Sea" was christened on April 19, 2012 in Supetar, Hvar with Croatian poet and novelist Vesna Krmpotić as her godmother.

 this traditional bracera was docked in ACI Marina Dubrovnik, used for educational purposes and special excursion tours with its main aims being the promotion and preservation of the maritime heritage of the Adriatic region.

Photo gallery

See also
 Bracera
 Falkuša
 Dalmatia
 Boat building
 Batana
 The Dolphin Dream Society

References

External links
 Official site of the bracera "Our Lady of the Sea" 
 Bračera Association 
 The Dolphin Dream Society 

Sailing ships
Ships of Croatia